Solomon and Kate Williams Jr. House, also known as The Anchorage, is a historic home located near Inez, Warren County, North Carolina.  It was built about 1880, and is a one-story, frame building with a low-pitched hip roof and an almost
square plan.  A one-story rear addition was built in 2000–2001.  It features a hip roofed front porch with sawnwork decoration.  Also on the property is a contributing smokehouse (c. 1880).

It was listed on the National Register of Historic Places in 2003.

References 

Houses on the National Register of Historic Places in North Carolina
Houses completed in 1880
Houses in Warren County, North Carolina
National Register of Historic Places in Warren County, North Carolina